Zena may refer to:

Places
Zena, New York, United States, a hamlet
Zena, Oklahoma, United States, a census-designated place
Zena, Oregon, United States, a ghost town
Genoa, Italy, known as "Zêna" in the Ligurian language

People 
Zena (given name)
 Zinaida Kupriyanovich or ZENA, Belarusian singer

See also
Zenas (disambiguation)
Zina (disambiguation)
Xena (disambiguation)